Eugène Schaus (12 May 1901 – 29 March 1978) was a Luxembourgian politician and jurist.  Schaus was a leading light in the early days of the Democratic Party, of which he would be President from 1952 until 1959.

Schaus held office in a number of governments, under Pierre Dupong and Pierre Werner, over a period of thirty years.  He served as the Deputy Prime Minister, a position created especially for Schaus, in Werner's first government.  He would serve in this capacity again (1969–1974), as well as holding a number of other high offices.

Career
An experienced lawyer, Schaus was elected to the Chamber of Deputies in 1937, in which he served until 1940, when the country was occupied by Nazi Germany and the Chamber was suspended.  Having refused to swear allegiance to the occupying forces, Eugene Schaus, his wife and their three children spent most of the war in German deportation camps in Eastern Europe, and returned only at the end of the war. He was the Group for Patriotism and Democracy member of the National Union Government, as Minister for the Interior, and was elected at the next election, in 1945.  He would remain in the Chamber of Deputies, as either a sitting deputy or a government minister, until 1974.

Schaus was recognised as the foremost liberal politician in 1947 by his inclusion in the Christian Social People's Party-Democratic Group coalition under Pierre Dupong, adding the position of Minister for Justice to that for the Interior.  Due to his leadership of the GD into this government, it is known as the 'Dupong-Schaus Ministry'.  In 1951, the CSV formed a coalition with the Luxembourg Socialist Workers' Party, ejecting Schaus from government.  The following year, Schaus was elected Democratic Party, succeeding Lucien Dury.

In 1958, a scandal over government corruption allowed Schaus, as opposition leader, to lever himself, and the party (by now renamed the 'Democratic Party') back into government.  Schaus alleged that the government had been offered a bribe by a contractor; whilst refusing it and eliminating the company from the list of bidders, the attempted bribe was not reported within the required window, and the government collapsed.  The general election held the following year, the Democratic Party almost doubled its share of seats, and replaced the LSAP in the governing coalition that was formed after the election and the death of Prime Minister Pierre Frieden.

Footnotes

|-

|-

|-

|-

|-

|-

|-

|-

|-

|-

Ministers for Justice of Luxembourg
Ministers for Foreign Affairs of Luxembourg
Ministers for Defence of Luxembourg
Deputy Prime Ministers of Luxembourg
Ministers for the Police Force of Luxembourg
Members of the Chamber of Deputies (Luxembourg)
Democratic Party (Luxembourg) politicians
20th-century Luxembourgian lawyers
1901 births
1978 deaths
People from Junglinster
Grand Crosses 1st class of the Order of Merit of the Federal Republic of Germany